The men's javelin throw event at the 1938 British Empire Games was held on 5 February at the Sydney Cricket Ground in Sydney, Australia.

Results

References

Athletics at the 1938 British Empire Games
1938